Cestius may refer to:
 Male members of the Cestia gens, an ancient Roman family
 Pons Cestius, a stone bridge over the river Tiber in Rome
 Pyramid of Cestius, a small pyramid in Rome